The 23rd Annual Latin Grammy Awards ceremony was held on Thursday, November 17, 2022, at the Michelob Ultra Arena, Las Vegas to honour the best musical releases within Latin music released from June 1, 2021, to May 31, 2022. The nominations were announced via a virtual livestream on September 20, 2022, presented by Kany García, Christina Aguilera, Banda Los Sebastianes, Becky G, Yotuel, Criolo, Nicky Jam, Akapellah, Luísa Sonza, Sebastián Yatra and Camilo. The three-hour ceremony aired live on Univision and was hosted by singers Anitta, Luis Fonsi, Laura Pausini and Thalía.

In April 2022, Mexican singer and songwriter Marco Antonio Solís was named Person of the Year by the Latin Recording Academy. Singers and musicians Rosario Flores, Myriam Hernández, Rita Lee, Amanda Miguel and Yordano are set to receive the Lifetime Achievement Award while Spanish singer Manolo Díaz, Cuban saxophonist Paquito D'Rivera and Mexican bassist Abraham Laboriel are this year's recipients of the Trustees Award.

Performances

Presenters

Premiere ceremony
 Miguel Ángel Muñoz – host
 Debi Nova – host
 Marina Sena
 Mario Quintero Lara from Los Tucanes de Tijuana
 Elena Rose
 Jão
 Edgar Barrera
 Mahmundi

Main ceremony
 Miguel Ángel Muñoz and Kany García – presented Best Salsa Album
 Macarena Achaga and Fonseca – presented Best Pop Vocal Album
 María Becerra and Luis Figueroa – presented Best New Artist
 Ludmilla and Kurt – presented Best Urban Music Album
 Adrián Uribe, Alison Solís and Marla Solís – presented Best Contemporary Tropical Album
 Georgina Rodríguez and Luisa Sonza – presented Best Traditional Pop Vocal Album
 Yalitza Aparicio and Becky G – presented Best Ranchero/Mariachi Album
 Cami and Edén Muñoz – presented Record of the Year
 Farina and Víctor Manuelle – presented Song of the Year
 Fito Páez – presented Album of the Year

Winners and nominees
The nominations were announced on September 20, 2022. The winners are listed first and in bold.

General
Record of the Year
"Tocarte" – Jorge Drexler & C. Tangana

Carles Campi Campón, Jorge Drexler, Víctor Martínez, Pablopablo & C. Tangana, record producers; Carles Campi Campón, recording engineer; Carles Campi Campón, mixer; Fred Kevorkian, mastering engineer
 "Pa Mis Muchachas" – Christina Aguilera, Becky G, Nicki Nicole featuring Nathy Peluso
 Rafael Arcaute, Jean Rodriguez, Afo Verde & Federico Vindver, record producers; Rafael Arcaute, Ray Charles Brown, Jr., Jean Rodríguez & Federico Vindver, recording engineers; Jaycen Joshua, mixer; Jaycen Joshua, mastering engineer
 "Castillos de Arena" – Pablo Alborán
 Paco Salazar, record producer; Felipe Guevara, mixer; Dave Kutch, mastering engineer
 "Envolver" – Anitta
 Freddy Montalvo, record producer; Freddy Montalvo, mixer; Colin Leonard, mastering engineer
 "Pa'lla Voy" – Marc Anthony
 Marc Anthony, Julio Reyes Copello & Sergio George, record producers; Juan Mario Aracil, recording engineer; Juan Mario Aracil, mixer; Adam Ayan, mastering engineer
 "Ojitos Lindos" – Bad Bunny & Bomba Estereo
 Tainy, record producer; Josh Gudwin, mixer; Colin Leonard, mastering engineer
 "Pegao" – Camilo
 Édgar Barrera, Camilo & Nicolás Ramírez, record producers; Luis Barrera Jr., mixer; Mike Bozzi, mastering engineer
 "Provenza" – Karol G
 Ovy on the Drums, record producer; Ovy on the Drums, recording engineer; Rob Kinelski, mixer; David Kutch, mastering engineer
 "Vale la Pena" – Juan Luis Guerra
 Juan Luis Guerra & Janina Rosado, record producers; Amable Frometa & Allan Leschhorn, recording engineers; Allan Leschhorn, mixer; Adam Ayann, mastering engineer
 "LA FAMA" – Rosalía featuring The Weeknd
 Frank Dukes, El Guincho, Noah Goldstein, Dylan Patrice, Sky Rompiendo, Rosalía, Tainy & The Weeknd, record producers; Shin Kamiyama, Tyler Murphy & David Rodríguez, recording engineers; Manny Marroquin, mixer; Chris Gehringer, mastering engineer
 "Te Felicito" – Shakira & Rauw Alejandro
 Kevyn Mauricio Cruz Moreno, Alberto Carlos Melendez, Lenin Yorney Palacios, Shakira & Andrés Uribe Marín, record producers; Dave Clauss, Jorge E. Pizarro Ruiz, Cameron Gower Poole, Roger Rodés & Dani Val, recording engineers; Dave Clauss, mixer; Adam Ayan, mastering engineer
 "Baloncito Viejo" – Carlos Vives & Camilo
 Daniel Cortés, Andrés Leal, Martín Velilla & Carlos Vives, record producers; Andrés Borda, Daniel Cortés, Andrés Leal, Juan Sebastián Parra, Nicolás Ramírez & Martín Velilla, recording engineers; Manny Marroquin, mixer; Dave Kutch, mastering engineer

Album of the Year
Motomami (Digital Album) – Rosalía

James Blake, Frank Dukes, El Guincho, Noah Goldstein, Dylan Patrice, David Rodríguez, Jean Rodriguez, Sky Rompiendo, Rosalía, Tainy, Michael Uzowuru, The Weeknd & Pharrell Williams, album producers; Shin Kamiyama, Michael Larson, Sean Matsukawa, Tyler Murphy & David Rodríguez, album recording engineers; Manny Marroquin, album mixer; Rauw Alejandro, William Bevan, Daniel Gomez Carrero, LaShawn Daniels, Frank Dukes, El Guincho, Kamaal Fareed, Adam Feeney, Larry Gold, Noah Goldstein, Kaan Güneşberk, Teo Halm, Cory Henry, Chad Hugo, Fred Jerkins III, Rodney Jerkins, Tokischa Altagracia Peralta Juárez, James Blake Litherland, James W. Manning, Marco Masis, Juan Luis Morera, Urbani Mota Cedeño, William Ray Norwood Jr., Juan Ivan Orengo, Carlops Querol, Justin Rafael Quiles, David Rodríguez, Rosalía, Jacob Sherman, Alejandro Ramirez Suárez, So Y Tiet, Pilar Vila Tobella, Michael Uzowuru, José Miguel Vizcaya Sánchez, The Weeknd, Dylan Wiggins & Pharrell Williams, songwriters; Chris Gehringer, album mastering engineer
 Aguilera – Christina Aguilera
 Rafael Arcaute, Édgar Barrera, Josh Berrios, Andy Clay, DallasK, Feid, Honeyboos, Luis Barrera Jr., Jon Leone, Juan Diego Linares, Yasmil Marrufo, Mauricio Rengifo, Jean Rodríguez, Daniel Rondón, Slow, Andrés Torres, Afo Verde, Federico Vindver & Tobias Wincorn, album producers; Rafael Arcaute, Édgar Barrera, Andy Clay, Morgan David, Feid, Hi Flow, Luis Barrera Jr., Ray Charles Brown, Jr., Juan Diego Linares, Yasmil Marrufo, Mauricio Rengifo, Jean Rodríguez, Rafael Rodríguez, Matt Rollings, Slow, Andrés Torres, Felipe Trujillo & Federico Vindver, album recording engineers; Dj Riggins, Jaycen Joshua, Jacob Richards & Mike Seaberg, album mixers; Christina Aguilera, Rafael Arcaute, Édgar Barrera, Josh Berrios, Gino Borri, Luigi Castillo, Santiago Castillo, Jorge Luis Chacín, Andy Clay, Kat Dahlia, DallasK, Mario Domm, Feid, Becky G, Yoel Henríquez, Luis Barrera Jr., Carolina Colón Juarbe, Jon Leone, Juan Diego Linares, Yasmil Marrufo, Juan Morelli, Nicki Nicole, Ozuna, Nathy Peluso, Miguel Andrés Martínez Perea, Pablo Preciado, Servando Primera, Mauricio Rengifo, Rafael Rodríguez, Daniel Rondón, Elena Rose, Martina Stoessel, Sharlene Taule, Andrés Torres, Federico Vindver & Tobias Wincorn, songwriters; Jaycen Joshua, album mastering engineer
 Pa'llá Voy – Marc Anthony
 Marc Anthony, Sergio George & Julio Reyes Copello, album producers; Juan Mario Aracil & Gerardo Rodriguez, album recording engineers; Juan Mario Aracil, album mixer; Marc Anthony, Rafael Regginalds Aponte, Ángel Alberto Arce, Édgar Barrera, Luigi Castillo, Santiago Castillo, Alain De Armas, Yoenni José Echevarría Barrero, Sergio George, Reinaldo R. López, Álvaro Lenier Mesa, Johann Morales, Florentino Primera Mussett, Papa Serigne Seck & Elena Rose, songwriters; Adam Ayan, album mastering engineer
 Un Verano Sin Ti – Bad Bunny
 Martin Coogan, Demy & Clipz, Elikai, HAZE, La Pacencia, Cheo Legendary, MAG, MagicEnElBeat, Mora, Subelo Neo, Jota Rosa & Tainy, producers; Josh Gudwin & La Pacencia, mixers; Rauw Alejandro, Bad Bunny, Raquel Berrios, Joshua Conway, Mick Coogan, Jhay Cortez, Luis Del Valle, Elena Rose, Liliana Margarita Saumet, Orlando Javier Valle Vega & Maria Zardoya, songwriters; Colin Leonard, album mastering engineer
 Deja – Bomba Estéreo
 José Castillo, Simón Mejía & Jeff Peñalva, album producers; Daniel Bustos & Jeff Peñalva, album recording engineers; Damian Taylor, album mixer; Yemi Alade, Shyman Daniel Barry, Carles Campi Campón, José Castillo, Efraín Cuadrado, Leonel García, David M. Karbal, Simón Mejía, Jeff Peñalva, Lido Pimienta, Elizabeth Rodríguez, Liliana Saumet & Magdelys Savigne, songwriters; Chris Allgood & Emily Lazar, album mastering engineers
 Tinta y Tiempo – Jorge Drexler
 Rafa Arcaute, Javier Calequi, Carles Campi Campón, Jorge Drexler, Noga Erez, Didi Gutman, Victor Martínez, Pablopablo, C. Tangana & Federico Vindver, album producers; Daniel Alanís, Luis Enrique Becerra, Marc Blanes, Martín Buscaglia, Carles Campi Campón, Pablo Drexler, Lucas Piedracueva & Ori Rousso, album recording engineers; Carles Campi Campón & Daniel Carvalho, album mixers; Antón Álvarez Alfaro, Martín Buscaglia, Carlos Casacuberta, Jorge Drexler, Pablo Drexler, Noga Erez, Didi Gutman, Víctor Martínez, Alejandra Melfo, Ori Rousso & Fernando Velázquez, songwriters; Fred Kevorkian, album mastering engineer
 ya no somos los mismos – Elsa y Elmar
 Alizzz, Julián Bernal, Eduardo Cabra, Elsa Carvajal, Nico Cotton, Manuel Lara & Malay, album producers; Julián Bernal, Nico Cotton, Carlitos González, Alberto Hernández, Michel Kuri, Malay, Felipe Mejía, Jv Olivier, Juan Sebastián Parra, Alejandro García Partida & Alan Saucedo, album recording engineers; Julián Bernal, Mikaelin Bluespruce, Raúl López, Lewis Pickett & Harold Sanders, album mixers; Álvaro José Arroyo, Julián Bernal, Claudia Brant, Eduardo Cabra, Elsa Carvajal, Leonel García, Vicente García Guillen, Joel Mathias Isaksson, Luis Jiménez, Manuel Lara, McKlopedia, Oskar Lars Gustav Nyman & Pablo Preciado, songwriters; Julián Bernal & Dave Kutch, album mastering
 Viajante – Fonseca
 José Castillo, Fonseca, Juan Galeano, Yadam González, Simón Mejía, Mauricio Rengifo, Julio Reyes Copello & Andrés Torres, album producers; José Castillo, Sebastian De Peyrecave, Antonio Espinosa Holguín, Fonseca, Juan Galeano, Yadam González, Carlos Fernando López, Simón Mejía, Nicolás Ramírez, Mauricio Rengifo, Julio Reyes Copello, Alen Hadzi Stefanov, Andrés Torres & Daniel Uribe, album recording engineers; Jaycen Joshua, Trevor Muzzy, Tom Norris & Alejandro Patiño, album mixers; Mario Cáceres, José Castillo, Andy Clay, Silvestre Dangond, Juan Fernando Fonseca, Juan Galeano, Miguel Yadam González, Yoel Henríquez, Erick Alejandro Iglesias Rodríguez, Simón Mejía, Greeicy Rendón, Alejandro Rengifo, Mauricio Rengifo, Julio Reyes Copello & Andrés Torres, songwriters; Dave Kutch, Tom Norris & Alejandro Patiño, album mastering engineers
 Sanz – Alejandro Sanz
 Carlos Jean, Javier Limón, Alfonso Pérez & Alejandro Sanz, album producers; Carlos Del Valle, Daniel Guzmán, Andrew Hey, Sebastián Laverde, Marcos Mejías, Alfonso Pérez, Martin Roller, Alexander Sánchez "Kyd", Iván Valdés & Peter Walsh, album recording engineers; Peter Walsh, album mixer; Beatriz Álvarez Beigbeder Casas, Maria Alejandra Álvarez Beigbeder Casas, Viviana Álvarez Beigbeder Casas, María Ángeles Álvarez Beigbeder Casas, Juan D'anyelica, Paco De Lucía, Limon Jr, Javier Limón, Isidro Muñoz Alcón, José Miguel Muñoz Alcón, Alfonso Pérez & Alejandro Sanz, songwriters; Frank Arkwright, album mastering engineer
 Dharma – Sebastian Yatra
 Julián Bernal, Caleb Calloway, Cashae, Pablo María Rousselon De Croisoeuil Chateaurenard, Andrés Guerrero, Hear This Music, Manuel Lara, Jon Leone, Pablo López, Joan Josep Monserrat Riutort, Gabriel Morales, Andres Munera, Noise Up, Ovy on the Drums, Mauricio Rengifo, Julio Reyes Copello, Andrés Torres & Xaxo, album producers; César Augusto, Andrés Guerrero, John Hanes, Jonathan Julca, Nicolas Ladrón De Guevara, Manuel Lara, Jon Leone, Maya, Max Miglin, Andres Munera, Anthony Edward Ralph Parrilla Medina, Mauricio Rengifo, Julio Reyes Copello, Daniel Riaño, Jean Rodriguez, Natalia Schlesinger & Andrés Torres, album recording engineers; Serban Ghenea, Andrés Guerrero Ruiz, Jaycen Joshua, Mosty, Tom Norris & Natalia Schlesinger, album mixers; Rauw Alejandro, Benjamin Alerhand Sissa, J Angel, Juan Diego Arteaga, César Augusto, Joseph Michael Barrios, Julián Bernal, Manuel Alejandro Bustillo, Jorge Celedón, Orlando J. Cepeda Matos, Andy Clay, Manuel Enrique Lara Colmenares, Pablo María Rousselon De Croisoeuil, Kevyn Mauricio Cruz Moreno, Daddy Yankee, Alvaro Diaz, Alejandro Manuel Fernandez, Rosario Flores, Manuel Lorente Freire, Pablo C Fuentes, David Julca, Jonathan Julca, Manuel Lara, Jonathan David Leone, Hector C Lopez, Pablo Lopez, Luian Malave, Christian Daniel Mojica Blanco, Joan Josep Monserrat Riutort, Natti Natasha, Aitana Ocaña, Ovy on the Drums, Daniel Perez Venencia, Luis J. Perez Jr, Mariah Angelique Perez, Raphy Pina, Alejandro Rengifo, Mauricio Rengifo, José M. Reyes, Julio Reyes Copello, Juan Josep Monserrat Riutort, Elena Rose, Rafael Salcedo, Jean Carlos Santiago, Sech, Edgar Semper, Xavier Semper, Julio Manuel Gonzalez Tavarez, Andres Torres, Michael Torres Monge, Manuel Turizo, Alejandro Robledo Valencia, Elian Angel Valenzuela, Juan Camilo Vargas & Sebastián Yatra, songwriters; Mike Bozzi, Gene Grimaldi, Dave Kutch, Mosty & Tom Norris, mastering engineers

Song of the Year
"Tocarte" – Jorge Drexler & C. Tangana

Jorge Drexler, Pablo Drexler, Víctor Martínez & C. Tangana, songwriters
 "A Veces Bien Y A Veces Mal" – Ricky Martin featuring Reik
 Pedro Capó, Kiko Cibrian, Ricky Martin, Pablo Preciado, Julio Ramirez, Mauricio Rengifo & Andrés Torres, songwriters
 "Agua" – Daddy Yankee, Rauw Alejandro & Nile Rodgers
 Rauw Alejandro, Emmanuel Anene, David Alberto Macias, Nile Rodgers, Juan Salinas, Oscar Salinas & Daddy Yankee, songwriters
 "Algo es Mejor" – Mon Laferte
 Mon Laferte, songwriter
 "Baloncito Viejo" – Carlos Vives & Camilo
 Camilo, Jorge Luis Chacín, Andrés Leal, Martín Velilla & Carlos Vives, songwriters
 "Besos en la Frente" – Fonseca
 Fonseca & Julio Reyes Copello, songwriters
 "Encontrarme" – Carla Morrison
 Carla Morrison, Juan Alejandro Jimenez Perez & Mario Demian Jimenez Perez, songwriters
 "Hentai" – Rosalía
 Larry Gold, Noah Goldstein, Chad Hugo, David Rodríguez, Rosalía, Jacob Sherman, Michael Uzowuru, Pilar Vila Tobella, Dylan Wiggins & Pharrell Williams, songwriters
 "índigo" – Camilo & Evaluna Montaner
 Édgar Barrera & Camilo, songwriters
 "Pa Mis Muchachas" – Christina Aguilera, Becky G, Nicki Nicole featuring Nathy Peluso
 Christina Aguilera, Jorge Luis Chacín, Kat Dahlia, Becky G, Yoel Henríquez, Yasmil Marrufo, Nicki Nicole & Nathy Peluso, songwriters
 "Provenza" – Karol G
 Kevyn Mauricio Cruz Moreno, Carolina Giraldo Navarro & Ovy on the Drums, songwriters
 "Tacones Rojos" – Sebastián Yatra
 Juan Jo, Manuel Lara, Manuel Lorente, Pablo & Sebastian Yatra, songwriters

Best New Artist
Angela Alvarez

Silvana Estrada
 Sofía Campos
 Cande y Paulo
 Clarissa
 Pol Granch
 Nabález
 Tiare
 Vale
 Yahritza y Su Esencia
 Nicole Zignago

Pop
Best Pop Vocal Album
Dharma – Sebastián Yatra ya no somos los mismos – Elsa y Elmar
 El Amor Que Merecemos – Kany García
 Clichés – Jesse & Joy
 El Renacimiento – Carla Morrison

Best Traditional Pop Vocal AlbumAguilera – Christina Aguilera Viajante – Fonseca
 Filarmónico 20 Años – Marta Gómez
 La Vida – Kurt
 Frecuencia – Sin Bandera

Best Pop Song"La Guerrilla de la Concordia" – Jorge DrexlerJorge Drexler, songwriter"Tacones Rojos" – Sebastián YatraPablo María Rousselon De Croisoeuil, Manuel Lara, Manuel Lorente, Juan Josep Monserrat Riutort & Sebastián Yatra, songwriters "Baloncito Viejo" – Carlos Vives & Camilo
 Camilo, Jorge Luis Chacín, Andrés Leal, Martín Velilla & Carlos Vives, songwriters
 "Besos en la Frente" – Fonseca
 Julio Reyes Copello & Fonseca, songwriters
 "Índigo" – Camilo & Evaluna Montaner
 Édgar Barrera & Camilo, songwriters

Urban
Best Urban Fusion/Performance"Tití Me Preguntó" – Bad Bunny "Pa Mis Muchachas" – Christina Aguilera, Nicki Nicole, Becky G featuring Nathy Peluso
 "Santo" – Christina Aguilera & Ozuna
 "Volví" – Bad Bunny & Aventura
 "This is Not America" – Residente featuring Ibeyi

Best Reggaeton Performance"Lo Siento BB:/" – Tainy, Bad Bunny & Julieta Venegas "Desesperados" – Rauw Alejandro & Chencho Corleone
 "Envolver" – Anitta
 "Yonaguni" – Bad Bunny
 "Nicky Jam: Bzrp Music Sessions, Vol. 41" – Bizarrap & Nicky Jam

Best Urban Music AlbumUn Verano Sin Ti – Bad Bunny Respira – Akapellah
 Trap Cake, Vol. 2 – Rauw Alejandro
 Los Favoritos 2.5 – Arcángel
 Animal – María Becerra

Best Rap/Hip Hop Song"De Museo" – Bad BunnyBad Bunny, songwriter "Amor" – Akapellah
 Akapellah, songwriter
 "Dance Crip" – Trueno
 Santiago Ruiz, Brian Taylor & Trueno, songwriters
 "El Gran Robo, Pt. 2" – Lito MC Cassidy & Daddy Yankee
 Phanlon Anton Alexander, Geovanny Andrades Andino, Daddy Yankee & Lito MC Cassidy, songwriters
 "Freestyle 15" – Farina
 Farina, songwriter

Best Urban Song"Tití Me Preguntó" – Bad BunnyBad Bunny, songwriter "Desesperados" – Rauw Alejandro & Chencho Corleone
 Rauw Alejandro, José M. Collazo, Chencho Corleone, Jorge Cedeño Echevarria, Luis Jonuel González, Eric Pérez Rovira, Jorge E. Pizarro Ruiz & Nino Karlo Segarra, songwriters
 "Lo Siento BB:/" – Tainy, Bad Bunny & Julieta Venegas
 Bad Bunny, Tainy & Julieta Venegas, songwriters
 "Mamiii" – Becky G & Karol G
 Luis Miguel Gomez Castaño, Becky G, Karol G, Ovy on the Drums, Justin Quiles, Elena Rose & Daniel Uribe, songwriters
 "Ojos Rojos" – Nicky Jam
 Samantha M. Cámara, Nicky Jam, Vicente Jiménez, Dallas James Koehlke, Manuel Larrad & Juan Diego Medina Vélez, songwriters

Rock
Best Rock AlbumUnas Vacaciones Raras – Él Mató a un Policía Motorizado Mojigata – Marilina Bertoldi
 Cada Vez Cadáver – Fito & Fitipaldis
 1021 – La Gusana Ciega
 RPDF – Whiplash

Best Rock Song"Lo Mejor de Nuestras Vidas" – Fito PáezFito Páez, songwriter "Día Mil" – Eruca Sativa
 Eruca Sativa, songwriters
 "Esperando una Señal" – Bunbury
 Bunbury, songwriter
 "Finisterre" – Vetusta Morla
 Juan Manuel Latorre, songwriter
 "No Olvidamos" – Molotov
 Molotov, songwriters
 "QUE SE MEJOREN" – WOS
 WOS & Facundo Yalve, songwriters

Best Pop/Rock AlbumLos Años Salvajes – Fito Páez Trinchera – Babasónicos
 Monstruos – Bruses
 La Dirección – Conociendo Rusia
 Cable a Tierra – Vetusta Morla

Best Pop/Rock Song"Babel" – Carlos Vives & Fito PáezFito Páez & Carlos Vives, songwriters "ARRANCARMELO" – WOS
 WOS & Facundo Yalve, songwriters
 "Bye Bye" – Babasónicos
 Diego Castellano, Adrian Dargelos & Gustavo Torres, songwriters
 "Disfraz" – Conociendo Rusia
 Felicitas Colina & Conociendo Rusia, songwriters
 "qué voy a hacer conmigo??" – Elsa y Elmar
 Bruses, Elsa y Elmar & Alan Saucedo, songwriters

Alternative
Best Alternative Music AlbumMotomami (Digital Album) – Rosalía The Sacred Leaf – Afro-Andean Funk
 Kick II – Arca
 Deja – Bomba Estéreo
 El Disko – CA7RIEL

Best Alternative Song"El Día que Estrenaste el Mundo" – Jorge DrexlerJorge Drexler, songwriter "Bad Bitch" – CA7RIEL
 Ca7riel & Tomas Sainz, songwriters
 "00:00" – Siddhartha
 Alejandro Pérez, Siddhartha & Rul Velázquez, songwriters
 "Conexión Total" – Bomba Estéreo & Yemi Alade
 Yemi Alade, Carles Campi Campón, José Castillo, Jeff Peñalva, Liliana Saumet & Magdelys Savigne, songwriters
 "Culpa" – WOS featuring Ricardo Mollo
 Ricardo Mollo, Omar Varela, WOS & Facundo Yalve, songwriters
 "Hentai" – Rosalía
 Larry Gold, Noah Goldstein, Chad Hugo, Rosalía, David Rodríguez, Jacob Sherman, Michael Uzowuru, Pilar Vila Tobella, Dylan Wiggins & Pharrell Williams, songwriters

Tropical
Best Salsa AlbumPa'llá Voy – Marc Anthony Será Que Se Acabó – Alexander Abreu & Havana D'Primera
 Luis Figueroa – Luis Figueroa
 Y Te lo Dice... – Luisito Ayala and La Puerto Rican Power
 Lado A Lado B – Víctor Manuelle

Best Cumbia/Vallenato AlbumFeliz Aniversario – Jean Carlos Centeno and Ronal Urbina Clásicos de Mi Cumbia – Checo Acosta
 Quiero Verte Feliz – La Santa Cecilia
 El de Siempre – Felipe Peláez
 Yo Soy Colombia – Zona 8 R & Rolando Ochoa

Best Merengue/Bachata AlbumEntre Mar y Palmeras – Juan Luis Guerra Este Soy Yo – Héctor Acosta "El Torito"
 Multitudes – Elvis Crespo
 Resistirá – Milly Quezada
 Tañon Pal' Combo es lo que Hay – Olga Tañón

Best Traditional Tropical AlbumGonzalo Rubalcaba y Aymée Nuviola Live in Marciac – Gonzalo Rubalcaba and Aymée Nuviola Café con Cariño – Renesito Avich
 Chabuco Desde el Teatro Colón de Bogotá – Chabuco
 Gran Combo Pa' Rato – Septeto Nacional Ignacio Piñeiro
 Canten – Leoni Torres

Best Contemporary Tropical AlbumCumbiana II – Carlos Vives El Mundo está Loco – Jorge Luis Chacín
 De Menor a Mayor – Gente De Zona
 All Inclusive – Marissa Mur
 Tropico – Pavel Núñez

Best Tropical Song"Mala" – Marc AnthonyMarc Anthony & Álvaro Lenier Mesa, songwriters "Agüita e Coco" – Kany García
 Mario Cáceres, Jorge Luis Chacín, Kany García, Richi López & Yasmil Marrufo, songwriters
 "El Malecón vió el Final" – Amaury Gutiérrez
 Jorge Luis Piloto, songwriter
 "El Parrandero (Masters en Parranda)" – Carlos Vives, Sin Ánimo De Lucro, JBot & Tuti
 Juan Botero, Miguel Henao, Alvaro Negret, Santiago Restrepo, Joaquin Rodríguez, Juan José Roesel, Sin Ánimo De Lucro, José Nicolás Urdinola, Juan "One" Sebastián Valencia & Carlos Vives, songwriters
 "Fiesta Contigo" – Luis Figueroa
 Luis Figueroa & Yoel Henríquez, songwriters

Songwriter
Best Singer-Songwriter AlbumTinta y Tiempo – Jorge Drexler Malvadisco – Caloncho
 Agendas Vencidas – El David Aguilar
 Marchita – Silvana Estrada
 En lo Que Llega la Primavera – Alex Ferreira
 El Viaje – Pedro Guerra

Regional Mexican
Best Ranchero/Mariachi AlbumEP 1# Forajido – Christian Nodal Mexicana Enamorada – Ángela Aguilar
 Mi Herencia, Mi Sangre – Majo Aguilar
 40 Aniversario Embajadores del Mariachi – Mariachi Sol de Mexico de José Hernández
 Qué Ganas de Verte (Deluxe) – Marco Antonio Solís

Best Banda AlbumAbeja Reina – Chiquis Esta Vida es Muy Bonita – Banda El Recodo de Cruz Lizárraga
 Va de Nuevo – Banda Fortuna
 Me Siento a Todo Dar – Banda Los Recoditos
 Sin Miedo al Éxito (Deluxe) – Banda Los Sebastianes

Best Tejano AlbumPara Que Baile Mi Pueblo – Bobby Pulido Despreciado – El Plan
 Camino al Progreso – Grupo Álamo
 Una Ilusión – Isabel Marie
 Dime Cómo se Siente – Destiny Navaira

Best Norteño AlbumLa Reunión (Deluxe) – Los Tigres del Norte Bienvenida la Vida – Bronco
 Corridos Felones (Serie35) – Los Tucanes de Tijuana
 Esta se Acompañas con Cerveza – Pesado
 Obsessed – Yahritza y Su Esencia

Best Regional Mexican Song"Como lo Hice Yo" – Matisse & Carin LeónÉdgar Barrera, Carin León & Matisse, songwriters "Ahpi Donde Me Ven" – Ángela Aguilar
 Gussy Lau, songwriters
 "Cada Quien" – Grupo Firme and Maluma
 Édgar Barrera, Eduin Caz, Nathan Galante, Maluma & Horacio Palencia, songwriters
 "Chale" – Eden Muñoz
 Eden Muñoz, songwriter
 "Cuando Me Dé la Gana" – Christina Aguilera & Christian Nodal
 Christina Aguilera, Rafael Arcaute, Jorge Luis Chacín, Kat Dahlia, Yoel Henríquez, Yasmil Marrufo & Federico Vindver, songwriters
 "Nunca te Voy a Olvidar" – Mireya featuring Flor de Toloache, Roman Rojas & Jorge Glem
 Mireya & Roman Rojas, songwriters
 "Vivo en el 6" – Christian Nodal
 Édgar Barrera, Eden Muñoz & Christian Nodal, songwriters

Instrumental
Best Instrumental AlbumMaxixe Samba Groove – Hamilton de Holanda Back to 4 – C4 Trío
 Gerry Weil Sinfónico – Gerry Weil & Orquesta Sinfónica Simón Bolívar
 Ofrenda – Grupo Raíces de Venezuela
 Ella – Daniela Padrón & Glenda Del E

Traditional
Best Folk AlbumAncestro Sinfónico – Sintesis, X-Alfonso y Eme Alfonso La Tierra Llora – Paulina Aguirre
 Quédate en Casa – Eva Ayllón
 Flor y Raíz – Pedro Aznar
 Palabras Urgentes – Susana Baca
 Un Canto por México – El Musical – Natalia Lafourcade
 Bendiciones – Sandra Mihanovich

Best Tango AlbumHoracio Salgán Piano Transcriptions – Pablo Estigarribia Alma Vieja – Los Tangueros del Oeste
 Tango – Ricardo Montaner
 Milonguero – Pablo Motta Ensamble featuring Franco Luciani
 Tango de Nuevos Ayres – Mariana Quinteros
 Spinettango – Spinettango

Best Flamenco AlbumLibres – Las Migas Orgánica – Carmen Doorá
 Leo – Estrella Morente
 El Cante – Kiki Morente
 Ranchera Flamenca – María Toledo

Jazz
Best Latin Jazz/Jazz AlbumMirror Mirror – Eliane Elias, Chick Corea, Chucho Valdés Jobim Forever – Antonio Adolfo
 #Cubanamerican – Martin Bejerano
 Chabem – Chano Domínguez, Rubem Dantas & Hamilton de Holanda

Christian
Best Christian Album (Spanish Language)Viviré – Marcos Witt Ya Llegó la Primavera – Aroddy
 Alfa y Omega – Athenas
 ¿Quién Dijo Miedo? (Live) – Gilberto Daza
 ¿Cómo Me Ves? – Jesús Adrián Romero

Best Christian Album (Portuguese Language)Laboratório do Groove – Eli Soares Antes da Terapia – Asaph
 O Samba e o Amor – Antonio Cirilo
 Epifania – Clovis
 És Tudo – Bruna Karla

 Portuguese Language 
Best Portuguese Language Contemporary Pop AlbumSim Sim Sim – Bala Desejo Pra Gente Acordar – Gilsons
 Pirata – Jão
 De Primeira – Marina Sena
 Doce 22 – Luísa Sonza

Best Portuguese Language Rock or Alternative AlbumO Futuro Pertence à... Jovem Guarda – Erasmo Carlos QVVJFA? – Baco Exu Do Blues
 Sobre Viver – Criolo
 Memórias (De Onde eu Nunca Fui) – Lagum
 Delta Estácio Blues – Juçara Marçal

Best Samba/Pagode AlbumNumanice #2 – Ludmilla Bons Ventos – Nego Alvaro
 Mistura Homogênea – Martinho Da Vila
 Desengaiola – Alfredo Del-Penho, João Cavalcanti, Moyseis Marques e Pedro Miranda
 Céu Lilás – Péricles

Best MPB (Musica Popular Brasileira) AlbumIndigo Borboleta Anil – Liniker Pomares – Chico Chico
 Síntese do Lance – João Donato and Jards Macalé
 Nu Com a Minha Música – Ney Matogrosso
 Portas – Marisa Monte
 Meu Coco – Caetano Veloso

Best Sertaneja Music AlbumChitãozinho & Xororó Legado – Chitãozinho & Xororó Agropoc – Gabeu
 Expectativa x Realidade – Matheus & Kauan
 Patroas 35% – Marília Mendonça, Maiara & Maraísa
 Natural – Lauana Prado

Best Portuguese Language Roots AlbumSenhora Estrada – Alceu Valença Afrocanto as Nações – Mateus Aleluia
 Na Estrada . Ao Vivo – Banda Pau e Corda Featuring Quinteto Violado
 Remelexo Bom – Luiz Caldas
 Belo Chico – Targino Gondim, Nilton Freittas, Roberto Malvezzi
 Senhora das Folhas – Áurea Martins
 Oríki – Iara Rennó

Best Portuguese Language Song"Vento Sardo" – Marisa Monte featuring Jorge DrexlerJorge Drexler & Marisa Monte, songwriters "Baby 95" – Liniker
 Liniker, Mahmundi, Tássia Reis & Tulipa Ruiz, songwriters
 "Idiota" – Jão
Jão, Pedro Tófani & Zebu, songwriters
 "Me Corte Na Boca Do Céu a Morte Não Pede" – Criolo featuring Milton Nascimento
 Criolo & Tropkillaz, songwriters
 "Meu Coco" – Caetano Veloso
 Caetano Veloco, songwriter
 "Por Supuesto" – Marina Sena
 Iuri Rio Branco & Marina Sena, songwriters

Children's
Best Latin Children's AlbumA la Fiesta de la Música Vamos Todos – Sophia Marakei – Claraluna
 Danilo & Chapis, Vol. 2 – Danilo & Chapis
 Tarde de Juegos – Mi Casa Es Tu Casa
 La Sinfonía de los Bichos Raros – Puerto Candelaria

Classical
Best Classical AlbumLegado – Berta RojasSebastián Henríquez, album producer Brujos – Orquesta Sinfónica de Heredia
 Eddie Mora, conductor; Eddie Mora, album producer
 El Ruido del Agua – Eddie Mora
 Carlos Chaves & Eddie Mora, album producers
 Erika Ribeiro – Ígor Stravinsky, Sofia Gubaidúlina e Hermeto Pascoal – Erika Ribeiro
 Sylvio Fraga & Bernardo Ramos, album producers
 Villa-Lobos: Complete Violin Sonatas – Emmanuele Baldini, Pablo Rossi & Heitor Villa-Lobos

Best Classical Contemporary Composition"Anido's Portrait: I. Chararera" – Berta RojasSérgio Assad, composer "Adagio for Strings, A Mother's Love" – Juan Arboleda
Juan Arboleda, composer
 "Aurora" – Houston Symphony Orchestra featuring Andrés Orozco-Estrada (conductor) & Leticia Moreno (soloist)
 Jimmy López Bellido, composer
 "Canauê, for Orchestra" – Dimitri Cervo
 Dimitri Cervo, composer
 "Cuatro Haikus" – Orquesta Sinfónica de Heredia featuring José Arturo Chacón
 Eddie Mora, composer

Arrangement
Best Arrangement"El Plan Maestro" – Jorge DrexlerFernando Velázquez, arranger "Llévatela" – Armando Manzanero & EJE Ejecutantes de México
 Rosino Serrano, arranger
 "Son de la Loma" – Dani Barón
 Daniel Barón & Henry Villalobos, arranger
 "Adoro" – Alondra de la Parra & Buika
 Marco Godoy, arranger
 "Cucurrucucú Paloma" – Alondra de la Parra & Pitingo
 Paul Rubinstein, arranger

Recording Package
Best Recording PackageMotomami (Digital Album) – RosalíaFerran Echegaray, Viktor Hammarberg, Rosalía, Daniel Sannwald & Pili Vila, art directors Ancestras – Petrona Martinez
 Isaura Angulo, Carlos Dussán, Karen Flores, Manuel Garcia-Orozco, Juliana Jaramillo, Ledania & Lido Pimienta, art directors
 Bailaora – Mis Pies Son Mi Voz – Siudy Garrido featuring Ismael Fernandez, Manuel Gago, Jose Luis Rodriguez & Adolfo Herrera
 Pedro Fajardo & Siudy Garrido, art directors
 Cuano Te Muerdes el Labio (Edición Cerámica) – Leiva
 Boa Mistura, art director
 Feira Livre – Bananeira Brass Band
 Carlos Bauer, art director

Production
Best Engineered AlbumMotomami (Digital Album) – RosalíaChris Gehringer, engineer; Jeremie Inhaber, Manny Marroquin, Zach Peraya & Anthony Vilchis, mixers; Chris Gehringer, mastering engineer Dentro da Matrix – Érico Moreira
 Cesar J. De Cisneros & Érico Moreira, engineers; Érico Moreira, mixer; Felipe Tichauer, mastering engineer
 Indigo Borboleta Anil – Liniker
 Zé Nigro & Gustavo Ruiz, engineers; João Milliet & Rodrigo Sanches, mixers; Felipe Tichauer, mastering engineer
 Jobim Forever – Antonio Adolfo
 Marcelo Saboia, engineer; Marcelo Saboia, mixer; Andre Dias, mastering engineer
 ya no somos los mismos – Elsa y Elmar
 Julián Bernal, Nico Cotton, Carlitos González, Alberto Hernández, Michel Kuri, Malay, Felipe Mejía, Jv Olivier, Juan Sebastián Parra, Alejandro García Partida & Alan Saucedo, engineers; Julián Bernal, Mikaelin Bluespruce, Raúl López, Lewis Pickett & Harold Sanders, mixers; Julián Bernal & Dave Kutch, mastering engineers

Producer of the Year Julio Reyes Copello "Besos En La Frente" (Fonseca) 
 "Carne y Oro" (Cami & Art House) "Cuantas Veces" (Carlos Rivera, Reik) Koati Original Soundtrack (Various Artists) "Los Rotos" (Ela Taubert) "Nada Particular" (Miguel Bosé & Carlos Rivera) Pa'llá Voy (Marc Anthony) "Parte de Mi" (Nicki Nicole) "Puro Sentimiento" (Alejandro Lerner & Carlos Santana) "Quererte Bonito" (Sebastian Yatra & Elena Rose) "Se Nos Rompio El Amor" (David Bisbal) Édgar Barrera
 "Cada Quien" (Grupo Firme & Maluma)
 "Indigo" (Camilo & Evaluna Montaner)
 "Kesi Remix" (Camilo & Shawn Mendes)
 "999" (Selena Gomez & Camilo) 
 "Pegao" (Camilo) 
 "Pesadilla" (Camilo) 
 "Sobrio" (Maluma)
 Eduardo Cabra
 "Atravesao" (Elsa y Elmar) 
 "El Arca de Mima" (Mima)
 "Fiesta En Lo Del Dr. Hermes" (El Cuarteto de Nos)
 Hermes Croatto (Hermes Croatto)
 "La Ciudad Sin Alma" (El Cuarteto de Nos)
 "Mañosa" (Canina) 
 "Respiro Perdon" (Hermes Croato) 
 Nico Cotton
 "El Enemigo" (Conociendo Rusia)
 La Dirección (Conociendo Rusia)
 "Loco" (Tiago PZK) 
 Nena Trampa (Cazzu)
 "Primavera" (Elsa y Elmar)
 "Sobre Mi Tumba" (Cazzu)
 "Último y Primero" (Elsa y Elmar)
 "Vuelve" (Elsa y Elmar)
 Tainy
 "Candy" (Rosalía)
 "¿Cuándo Fue?" (Various Artists) 
 "Desenfocao'" (Rauw Alejandro)
 "En Mi Cuarto" (Various Artists) 
 "In Da Getto" (Various Artists) 
 "La Fama" (Various Artists) 
 "Lo Siento BB:/" (Various Artists) 
 "X Última Vez" (Daddy Yankee & Bad Bunny)
 "Yonaguni" (Bad Bunny)

Music Video
Best Short Form Music Video"This is Not America" – Residente featuring Ibeyi, Lisa-Kaindé Diaz & Naomi DiazGreg Ohrel, video director; Jason Cole, video producer "Mía" – Cami
 Nuno Gomes, video director; Mona Moreno Fernández & Ada Odreman, video producers
 "A Carta Cabal" – Guitarricadelafuente
 Pau Carrete, video director; Vivir Rodando, video producer
 "Hentai" – Rosalía
 Mitch Ryan, video director; Harrison Corwin & Patrick Donovan, video producers
 "Nadie" – Sin Bandera
 Hernán Corera & Juan Piczman, video directors; Sonti Charnas, Luca Macome, Balisario Saravia & Juan Saravia, video producers
 "Tocarte" – Jorge Drexler & C. Tangana
 Joana Colomar, video director; Zissou, video producer

Best Long Form Music VideoHasta la Raíz: El Documental'' – Natalia Lafourcade

Bruno Bancalari & Juan Pablo López-Fonseca, video directors; Juan Pablo López-Fonseca, video producer
 Bailaora – Mis Pies Son Mi Voz – Siudy Garrido
 Pablo Croce, video director; Pablo Croce, Siudy Garrido, Adrienne Arhst Center, video producer
 Motomami (Rosalía Tiktok Live Performance) – Rosalía
 Ferrán Echegaray, Rosalía & Stillz, video directors
 Romeo Santos: King of Bachata – Romeo Santos
 Devin Amar & Charles Todd, video directors; Katherine Aquino, Ned Doyle, Raphael Estrella, Sheira Rees-Davies, Amaury Rodríguez & James Rothman, video producers
 Matria'' – Vetusta Morla
 Patrick Knot, video director; Vetusta Morla, video producer

Special Awards
Person of the Year
 Marco Antonio Solís
Lifetime Achievement Award
 Rosario Flores
 Myriam Hernández
 Rita Lee
 Amanda Miguel
 Yordano
Trustees Award
 Manolo Díaz
 Paquito D'Rivera
 Abraham Laboriel

References

External links
The Latin Recording Academy Official Site

21st century in Las Vegas
2022 in Nevada
2022 in Latin music
2022 music awards
2022
November 2022 events in the United States